Kamenevo is a rural locality (a village) in Paustovskoye Rural Settlement, Vyaznikovsky District, Vladimir Oblast, Russia. The population was 16 as of 2010. There are 2 streets.

Geography 
Kamenevo is located 26 km southeast of Vyazniki (the district's administrative centre) by road. Glinishchi is the nearest rural locality.

References 

Rural localities in Vyaznikovsky District